Malvagna (Sicilian: Marvagna) is a comune (municipality) in the Metropolitan City of Messina in the Italian region Sicily, located about  east of Palermo and about  southwest of Messina.

Malvagna borders the following municipalities: Castiglione di Sicilia, Francavilla di Sicilia, Mojo Alcantara, Montalbano Elicona, Roccella Valdemone. It is in the Alcantara river valley, between the Mount Etna and Monte Mojo.

References

Cities and towns in Sicily